The Bravery Council of Australia Meeting 68 Honours List was announced by the Governor General of Australia, Major General Michael Jeffery,  on 17 March 2008.

Awards were announced for 
the Star of Courage,
the Bravery Medal,
Commendation for Brave Conduct and
Group Bravery Citation.

† indicates an award given posthumously.

Star of Courage

Robert Cook †, United States
Miss Kerri-Anne O’Meley †, New South Wales
Shane Robert Warburton, Australian Capital Territory

Bravery Medal (BM)

Senior Constable Peter Bruce Bailey, New South Wales Police Force
Senior Constable Timothy James Brown, New South Wales Police Force
Gregory John Flood, New South Wales
James Ronald Foley, Victoria
Steven James Foley †, Victoria
Arthur John Griffiths, New South Wales
Benjamin James Groves, New South Wales
Clayton Ashley Harris, New South Wales
Alex Gilbert Jimenez, New South Wales
Constable Eric Ian Lehaney, Canada
Senior Constable Daniela Linda Mattiuzzo, Northern Territory Police
Rachel Moore, Victoria
Senior Constable Bradley Nathan Muddle, New South Wales Police Force
Bevan John Roberts, New Zealand
Senior Constable Wayne Leslie Robinson, New South Wales Police Force
John Robert Ryan, United States
Richard Leslie Ryan, New South Wales
Donald Paul Smith, Queensland
Gregory Michael Taylor, New South Wales
John Toomey, New South Wales
Josiah Tamata’ane Tupou, Queensland
Sergeant Colin Patrick Woolesy, New South Wales Police Force

Commendation for Brave Conduct

Andrew John Bartley, Queensland
Stephen Wayne Bates, New South Wales
Ivor Brice, New South Wales
Travis James Brown, Queensland
Anthony John Bunton, New South Wales
Simon James Burnup, Western Australia
Paul Carstairs, Victoria
Stephen Maxwell Dowey, New South Wales
Douglas Kenneth Finucane, New South Wales
Senior Constable Christopher John Fowler, New South Wales Police
Andrew Robert Gordon, New South Wales
Sergeant Glenn Stanley Gorick, New South Wales Police
Rodney Anthony Gray, New South Wales
Timothy Daniel Gurry, Queensland
Joe Benjamin Hansen, New South Wales
Detective Senior Constable Alan Joseph Hodge, Northern Territory Police
Constable Amanda Louise Holloway, New South Wales Police
Paul Lindon Hoyle, Victoria
Andrew Frederick Johnson, New South Wales
Evan Alexander Jones, New South Wales
Nikolas Kokotovich, New South Wales
Neil Ian Leviston, Victoria
Detective Senior Constable Richard William Liston, New South Wales Police
Paul Stephen Lodge, New South Wales
Roslyn McMaster, New South Wales
Constable Lauren Anne McNeice, New South Wales Police
Senior Constable Andrew James Magrath, Northern Territory Police
Francis Lorn Mills, New South Wales
Glen John Mitcham, New South Wales
Kirk Scott Muir, Queensland
Keith David O'Brien, United Kingdom
Tim Pickworth, New South Wales
John Edward Purcell, New South Wales
John Bruce Robinson†, New South Wales
Constable Louise Sayton, Northern Territory Police
Aleksander John Searle, Victoria
David Wayne Smith, New South Wales
Andrew David Turnbull, Queensland
Detective Sergeant Edmund Leonard Turner, Northern Territory Police
Nigel Ray Wade, New South Wales
Warren Malcolm Wilkes, New South Wales
Evan Keith Winstanley, Queensland
Senior Constable Leanne Joy Woolsey, New South Wales Police
Stahy Zographakis, New South Wales

Group Bravery Citation
(added to the Group Bravery Citation awarded and gazetted on 29 August 2005)
Awardees comprise personnel of the Australian Embassy in Jakarta.
Alex Arena

References

Orders, decorations, and medals of Australia
2008 awards in Australia